The Abbey was a short-lived friction drive car assembled by the Abbey Auto Engineering Co. Ltd in Westminster, England. It used a 10.8 hp 1498 cc Coventry-Simplex engine.  It was built in 1922 only and cost £315. It also had Marles steering gear and friction drive. The two-seater model sold for £315.

Very few seem to have been made.

After 1922 the car may have been sold as the Lewis.

See also
 List of car manufacturers of the United Kingdom

References 
Georgano, G.N., "A.A.G.", in G.N. Georgano, ed., The Complete Encyclopedia of Motorcars 1885-1968  (New York: E.P. Dutton and Co., 1974), pp. 24.

Vintage vehicles
Vehicle manufacture in London
Defunct motor vehicle manufacturers of England